Lake Flevo was a lake in what is now the Netherlands, which existed in Roman times and the early Middle Ages. Some geographers believe that it was not a single lake, but rather a set of interconnected lakes.

From the Indo-European root *plew- "flow", 
the name was transmitted by the Roman geographer Pomponius Mela in describing this region. In his treatise on geography of 44 AD, Pomponius speaks of a Flevo Lacus. He writes: "The northern branch of the Rhine widens as Lake Flevo, and encloses an island of the same name, and then as a normal river flows to the sea". Other sources rather speak of Flevum, which could be related to today's Vlie (Vliestroom), i.e. the seaway between the Dutch islands of Vlieland and Terschelling. This last name is grammatically more probable for a geographical indication, which is why it is assumed that Pomponius confused the declension of the word giving the name Flevo. In fact the Vlie formed outfall from the lake into the North Sea.

Some texts of the middle-ages refer to this lake by the name of Almere. December 14, 1287, in what was called St. Lucia's flood during a memorable storm in Friesland and Holland, the North Sea invaded the freshwater lake, breaking and destroying several dams dunes and transformed it into a bay which was then called the Zuiderzee, meaning Southern Sea.

In the second half of the twentieth century the Flevopolders and a new province, Flevoland, took the name of the body of water which lay there long ago.

See also
Almere (lake)
Zuiderzee
IJsselmeer

References

Flevo
Flevo
Landforms of Flevoland
History of Flevoland